Franklyn Leon Smith (January 29, 1940 – March 8, 2019) was an American funk musician and R&B/soul songwriter. He was best known for his 1981 hit single "Double Dutch Bus".

Career
Smith went to college in Tennessee for elementary education with a minor in music. He became a writer for funk and soul artists such as the O'Jays and The Spinners. In 1972 he would record for Paramount, releasing a single called "Double Dutch" under the name Franklin Franklin, but it failed to become a hit. He was also influential in the careers of the rappers Tone Loc, Ice Cube and Snoop Dogg.

With his 1981 single "Double Dutch Bus", released by WMOT Records, Smith popularized a nonsensical form of slang (from his song "Slang thang", 1981 WMOT, Records), in which "iz" is placed in the middle of a word (for example, the word "place" becomes "plizace"), or the last letters of a word are replaced with "-izzle" ("sure" becomes shizzle).  A type of infix, it found greater popularity later on in hip hop and rap with its usage by Snoop Dogg.

Death
Smith died in Philadelphia on March 8, 2019.

Discography

Albums
1981: Children of Tomorrow
2006: Frankie Smith and His World Wide Party Crew

Singles
1980: "Double Dutch Bus"
1980: "Double Dutch"
1981: "The Auction"
1981: "Teeny-Bopper Lady"
1982: "Double Dutch Bus II"
1982: "Yo-Yo Champ (From Mississippi)"
1985: "Slapp Ya Thigh"
1985: "Congratulations for Graduating"

References

External links
[ Page on AllMusic.com]

20th-century African-American male singers
American male singers
African-American songwriters
American funk singers
Musicians from Philadelphia
Songwriters from Pennsylvania
1940 births
2019 deaths
21st-century African-American people
American male songwriters